Carlotta Brunelli (born ) is an Italian weightlifter, competing in the 75 kg category and representing Italy at international competitions. 

She competed at world championships, most recently at the 2014 World Weightlifting Championships.

She competed in the women's 71 kg event at the 2022 Mediterranean Games held in Oran, Algeria.

Major results

References

External links
http://www.federpesistica.it/mersin-carlotta-brunelli-medaglia-di-bronzo-nello-strappo-della-75-kg/
https://www.youtube.com/watch?v=3TA6gIwq11E
 http://www.robyjet.com/eventi/giochi-del-mediterraneo-xvii-carlotta-brunelli-e-bronzo-nello-slancio/
http://www.larena.it/home/sport/sorelle-brunelli-medaglie-di-famiglia-1.2944458
http://www.oasport.it/2016/04/sollevamento-pesi-europei-2016-pagliaro-e-bordignon-sognano-il-podio/rio-2016/
http://laltrogiornale.net/2013/01/29/campaldini-e-brunelli-atletica-scaligera-doro/
http://www.megamodo.com/201085677-europei-juniores-carlotta-brunelli-e-di-bronzo/

1993 births
Living people
Italian female weightlifters
Place of birth missing (living people)
Weightlifters at the 2010 Summer Youth Olympics
Mediterranean Games bronze medalists for Italy
Mediterranean Games medalists in weightlifting
Competitors at the 2013 Mediterranean Games
Competitors at the 2022 Mediterranean Games
21st-century Italian women